Abdal is a village in Gurdaspur. Gurdaspur is a district in the Indian state of Punjab.

References 

Indian Govt website with Abdal's details 

Villages in Gurdaspur district